OUTLOOKS was a Canadian LGBT magazine, published 10 times annually (monthly excepting combined issues in July/August and December/January).  Founded by Roy Heale in 1997 as a newsprint monthly, in 2009 the publication was purchased by Brett Taylor and was changed to a full gloss lifestyle magazine for the LGBT community. The head office was located in Calgary, Alberta.

In 2011 the publication was purchased by Mint Media Group in Toronto with a new editor, Jim Brosseau. There was an online version of the magazine and print subscribers were served by Canada Post, readers in major cities could also obtain copies at various businesses in gay village locations, and the publication was stocked at many Chapters/Indigo bookseller locations, making the magazine available to gay and lesbian readers outside traditional gay villages. Outlooks covered gay culture, bringing together editorial features by experts from across Canada on travel, politics, arts and entertainment, fashion, finance and issues of importance to Canada's LGBT communities from coast to coast.

On December 4, 2012, a news release was issued by the owner, Mint Media Publication (Patricia Salib), announcing that the publication was to be temporarily suspended to restructure the magazine for sustainability in a rapidly evolving market. Instead of reviving Outlooks, however, Mint Media has since repositioned its other publication, the local Toronto magazine In Toronto, into a national magazine branded as In Magazine.

External links
 Outlooks
 "Mint Media Group"

1990s LGBT literature
2000s LGBT literature
2010s LGBT literature
1997 establishments in Alberta
2012 disestablishments in Alberta
Defunct magazines published in Canada
LGBT culture in Toronto
LGBT-related magazines published in Canada
Magazines established in 1997
Magazines disestablished in 2012
Magazines published in Alberta
Magazines published in Toronto
Mass media in Calgary
Ten times annually magazines
LGBT literature in Canada